= Migrant Nation =

- Publisher: Anthem Press
- Publication date: 2018
- ISBN: 9781783087211

Migrant Nation: Australian Culture, Society and Identity is a non-fiction book published in 2018 by Anthem Press. It was edited by Paul Longley Arthur.

== General references ==
- Moran, Anthony (2019-04-03). "Migrant Nation: Australian Culture, Society and Identity". Australian Historical Studies. 50 (2): 275–276. doi:10.1080/1031461X.2019.1598324. ISSN 1031-461X.
- Piperoglou, Andonis (September 2019). "Migrant Nation: Australian Culture, Society and Identity". Australian Journal of Politics & History. 65 (3): 490–491. doi:10.1111/ajph.12599. hdl:10072/394409. ISSN 0004-9522.
